Leucostoma politifrons is a North American species of fly in the family Tachinidae.

References

Phasiinae
Diptera of North America
Insects described in 1974